Carlos Alberto Vario (born 17 October 1947) is an Argentine wrestler. He competed at the 1964 Summer Olympics and the 1968 Summer Olympics.

References

External links
 

1947 births
Living people
Argentine male sport wrestlers
Olympic wrestlers of Argentina
Wrestlers at the 1964 Summer Olympics
Wrestlers at the 1968 Summer Olympics
Sportspeople from Buenos Aires
20th-century Argentine people
21st-century Argentine people